McAdams is an unincorporated community in Attala County, Mississippi, United States.

McAdams is located on a branch of the former Illinois Central Railroad. At one point, McAdams was home to a general store, cotton gin, and saw mill. A post office began operation under the name McAdams in 1891.

Notable resident
Billy Ray Bates, professional basketball player.

References

Unincorporated communities in Attala County, Mississippi
Unincorporated communities in Mississippi